McCarron is a surname. Notable people with the surname include:

A. J. McCarron (born 1990), American football quarterback
Bob McCarron (born 1950), Australian medic and special effects prosthetic makeup artist
Cathal McCarron (born 1987), All Ireland Winning Gaelic footballer for Tyrone
Cathleen McCarron, Scottish film, television, theatre and audiobook actor and professional voice coach
Charles McCarron (1891–1919), United States Tin Pan Alley composer & lyricist
Chloe McCarron (born 1997), Northern Irish professional footballer
Chris McCarron (born 1955), American thoroughbred horse racing Hall of Fame retired jockey
Douglas J. McCarron (born 1950), labor union activist and president of the United Brotherhood of Carpenters and Joiners of America
James McCarron (1851–1918), Irish trade unionist
Joe McCarron, former radio DJ and electoral candidate from Dungloe
Karen McCarron (born 1968), Illinois physician who admitted to smothering her autistic daughter Katherine 'Katie' McCarron to death
Leon McCarron (born 1986), Northern Irish adventurer, filmmaker and author
Liam McCarron (born 2001), professional footballer
Lon McCarron or Lon McEachern (born 1956), American sports commentator
Michael McCarron (born 1995), American professional ice hockey player
Mike McCarron (1922–1991), American professional basketball player
Mitch McCarron (born 1992), Australian professional basketball player
Owen McCarron (1929–2005), Canadian cartoonist and publisher
Paul McCarron (1934–2013), American politician
Riley McCarron (born 1993), former American football wide receiver
Sarah McCarron, American actor and writer currently living and working in Los Angeles
Scott McCarron (born 1965), American professional golfer

See also
21698 McCarron (1999 RD56), a Main-belt Asteroid discovered in 1999
McCarrons Lake, a lake in Minnesota
Andrew McCarron Three-Decker, historic triple decker house at 3 Pitt Street in Worcester, Massachusetts
McCarron Internal Security Act
McCarron-Ferguson Act
Macaron
Maccarone (disambiguation)
McCarren